Beyduh (also Romanized as Beyduh, Beydook, and Bayduk) is a village in Sumay-ye Jonubi Rural District, Sumay-ye Beradust District, Urmia County, West Azerbaijan Province, Iran. At the 2006 census, its population was 368, in 64 families. It lies near the Iran–Turkey border.

References 

Populated places in Urmia County